Joseph Dudley "Benjy" Benjafield, MD (6 August 1887- 20 January 1957) was a British medical doctor and racing driver.

Career
Benjafield was in born in Edmonton, London, UK. He attended the University of London and received his MD from University College Hospital in 1912. Specializing in bacteriology, he served in Egypt during World War I and later used his expertise combating the great flu epidemic of 1918-1919.

Benjafield had a passion for motorsports which started with boating, but moved on to automobiles in the 1920s, following the accidental destruction of his beloved motor launch. Upon purchasing a Bentley 3-litre, he started racing in 1924 and 1925. Benjafield's success led to him being offered to drive a company racer at the behest of Bentley founder W.O. Bentley.

Benjafield later created the British Racing Drivers' Club, and continued racing until 1936. He died on 20 January 1957.

Racing record

Complete 24 Hours of Le Mans results

References

Bentley Boys
English racing drivers
24 Hours of Le Mans drivers
24 Hours of Le Mans winning drivers
People from Edmonton, London
Alumni of the University of London
1887 births
1957 deaths
Royal Army Medical Corps officers